Pascale Petit (born 20 December 1953), is a French-born British poet of French, Welsh and Indian heritage. She was born in Paris and grew up in France and Wales. She trained as a sculptor at the Royal College of Art and was a visual artist for the first part of her life. She has travelled widely, particularly in the Peruvian and Venezuelan Amazon and India.

Petit has published eight poetry collections, four of which were shortlisted for the T. S. Eliot Prize. Her seventh collection Mama Amazonica won the RSL Ondaatje Prize in 2018 and the inaugural Laurel Prize for Poetry in 2020. In 2018, Petit was elected as a Fellow of the Royal Society of Literature.

Biography
Petit has published eight poetry collections: Heart of a Deer (1998), The Zoo Father (2001), The Huntress (2005), The Treekeeper's Tale (2008), What the Water Gave Me: Poems after Frida Kahlo (2010), Fauverie (2014), Mama Amazonica (2017) and Tiger Girl (2020). She also published a pamphlet of poems The Wounded Deer: Fourteen Poems after Frida Kahlo (2005). Petit's 2020 collection Tiger Girl, was shortlisted for the Forward Prize for Best Collection. Her 2017 collection, Mama Amazonica, won the inaugural Laurel Prize for Poetry 2020, the 2018 RSL Ondaatje Prize, was a Poetry Book Society Choice and was shortlisted for the Roehampton Poetry Prize. The Zoo Father (2001) was a Poetry Book Society Recommendation. Fauverie (2014), What the Water Gave Me: Poems after Frida Kahlo (2010), The Huntress (2005) and The Zoo Father were all shortlisted for the T. S. Eliot Prize. Three books were books of the year in The Observer, The Times Literary Supplement and The Independent. What the Water Gave Me was shortlisted for the Wales Book of the Year. Petit has been shortlisted for the Forward Prize and in 2001 she was one of ten poets commissioned by BBC Radio 4 to write a poem for National Poetry Day. In 2004, she was selected by the Poetry Book Society as one of the Next Generation Poets. The Zoo Father is published in a bilingual edition in Mexico and distributed in Spain and Latin America. She has received many awards, including the Cholmondeley Award, four from Arts Council England and three from the Society of Authors. Her books have been translated into Chinese, Serbian, Spanish (in Mexico) and French. She has translated poems of a number of contemporary Chinese poets including Yang Lian, Wang Xiaoni and Zhai Yongming. She was Poetry Editor of Poetry London from 1990 to 2005, a Royal Literary Fund Fellow at Middlesex University from 2007 to 2009 and a Royal Literary Fund Fellow at the Courtauld Institute of Art in 2011–12. She tutored poetry courses for Tate Modern for nine years, and currently tutors for the Arvon Foundation, The Poetry School and Literature Wales. In 2018 Petit became a Fellow of the Royal Society of Literature.

The Australian poet Les Murray has praised her work in The Times Literary Supplement, where he wrote: "No other British poet I am aware of can match the powerful mythic imagination of Pascale Petit." Jackie Kay in The Observer wrote: "Pascale's poems are as fresh as paint, and make you look all over again at Frida and her brilliant and tragic life." Ruth Padel, reviewing What the Water Gave Me: Poems after Frida Kahlo in The Guardian wrote: "Petit's collection is not a verse biography, but a hard-hitting, palette-knife evocation of the effect that bus crash had on Kahlo's life and work. 'And this is how I started painting. / Time stretched out its spectrum / and screeched its brakes.' WH Auden, in his elegy for Yeats, tells the Irish poet: 'Mad Ireland hurt you into poetry.' Petit's collection, exploring the way trauma hurts an artist into creation, celebrates the rebarbative energy with which Kahlo redeemed pain and transformed it into paint."

Bibliography

Poetry 
 Icefall Climbing pamphlet (Smith Doorstop, 1994)
 Heart of a Deer (Enitharmon, 1998)
 Tying the Song Co-editor with Mimi Khalvati (Enitharmon, 2000)
 The Zoo Father (Seren, 2001)
 El Padre Zoológico/The Zoo Father (El Tucan, Mexico City, 2004)
 The Huntress (Seren, 2005)
 The Wounded Deer: Fourteen poems after Frida Kahlo pamphlet (Smith Doorstop, 2005)
 The Treekeeper's Tale (Seren, 2008)
 What the Water Gave Me: Poems after Frida Kahlo (Seren, UK, 2010, Black Lawrence Press, US, 2011)
 Poetry from Art at Tate Modern editor, pamphlet (Tate Publications, 2010)
 Fauverie (Seren, 2014)
 Mama Amazonica (Bloodaxe, 2017)
 Tiger Girl (Bloodaxe, 2020)

Critical studies and reviews of Petit's work
Mama Amazonica
 
 Financial Times, 25 May 2018, In Praise of Pascale Petit, a poet breaking into new territory by Nilanjana Roy

Awards, prizes and fellowships
 2000 – 'The Strait-Jackets' (from The Zoo Father) shortlisted for Forward Best Single Poem Prize
 2001 – New London Writers' Award
 2001 – Arts Council England Writers' Award
 2001 – The Zoo Father Poetry Book Society Recommendation
 2001 – The Zoo Father shortlisted for T.S. Eliot Prize
 2005 – The Huntress shortlisted for T.S. Eliot Prize
 2005 – Arts Council England Grants for the Arts Award
 2006 – Arts Council England Grants for the Arts Award
 2006 – Society of Author's Author's Foundation Award
 2007–09 – Royal Literary Fund Fellow at Middlesex University
 2010 – What the Water Gave Me shortlisted for T.S. Eliot Prize
 2011 – What the Water Gave me shortlisted for Wales Book of the Year
 2011 – Royal Literary Fund Fellowship at Courtauld Institute of Art
 2013 – Manchester Poetry Prize for five poems from Fauverie
 2014 – Fauverie shortlisted for T.S. Eliot Prize
 2015 – Cholmondeley Award
 2016 – Arts Council England Grants for the Arts Award
 2017 – Mama Amazonica was Poetry Book Society Choice
 2018 – Mama Amazonica wins the Ondaatje Prize
 2018 – Mama Amazonica shortlisted for Roehampton Poetry Prize
 2018 – Literature Matters Award from the Royal Society of Literature
 2018 – Fellow of the Royal Society of Literature
 2020 – 'Indian Paradise Flycatcher' wins Keats-Shelley Prize for Poetry
 2020 – Mama Amazonica wins the inaugural Laurel Prize for Poetry
 2020 – 'Tiger Girl' shortlisted for Forward Prize for Best Collection
 2021 – 'Tiger Girl' shortlisted for Wales Book of the Year (Poetry)

References

External links
 
 Author's Blog
 Profile and books listing at Bloodaxe publishers 
 Profile, works listing and videos at Seren publishers
 Pascale Petit recordings on The Poetry Archive
 Interview with Pascale Petit by The Poetry Extension

1953 births
Living people
20th-century French poets
21st-century French poets
20th-century Welsh poets
21st-century Welsh poets
20th-century French women writers
21st-century French women writers
20th-century Welsh women writers
21st-century Welsh women writers
21st-century Welsh writers
Welsh women poets
French women poets
Writers from Paris
Alumni of the Royal College of Art
Fellows of the Royal Society of Literature
Welsh people of French descent